Carlo Domenico Sartori (born 10 February 1948) is an Italian former footballer.

Born in Caderzone, Italy, the Sartoris moved to Manchester when Carlo was a child, and he grew up in the Collyhurst area of the city.

He came through the Manchester United youth team in the mid-1960s and was one of the first non-British or Irish players to come up through the junior ranks at the club. He signed as an apprentice with the club in July 1963, at the age of 15, turned professional at the age of 17, and made his debut for the club in October 1968, coming on as a substitute for Francis Burns in a 2–2 away draw against Tottenham Hotspur, becoming the club's very first non-British or Irish player.

He left in 1973, with a total of 55 appearances and 6 goals for Manchester United, and returned to Italy to sign for Bologna where he was part of the team that won the Coppa Italia 1973–74. He would later play for Lecce, SPAL 1907, Rimini and Trentino before retiring in 1984. With US Lecce won the Serie C championship in 1975-76 and, above all, the Anglo-Italian Cup, beating Scarborough in final (4-1).

References

1948 births
Living people
Sportspeople from Trentino
Manchester United F.C. players
Rimini F.C. 1912 players
U.S. Lecce players
S.P.A.L. players
Italian footballers
Italian expatriate footballers
Italian expatriate sportspeople in England
Association football midfielders
Footballers from Manchester
Footballers from Trentino-Alto Adige/Südtirol